The Monti Picentini Regional Park (Italian: Parco regionale Monti Picentini) is a natural preserve in Campania, southern Italy.

Geography
It is based on the Monti Picentini chain, a dolomitic-limestone area in the provinces of Avellino and Salerno. The park has a surface of 62,200 hectares and includes two natural oasis: that of Monte Polveracchio and that of Valle della Caccia.

Mountains
Monte Molaro

Communes
The following communes lie within the Monti Picentini Regional Park:

Acerno, Bagnoli Irpino, Calabritto, Calvanico, Campagna, Caposele, Castelvetere sul Calore, Castiglione del Genovesi, Chiusano di San Domenico, Eboli, Fisciano, Giffoni Sei Casali, Giffoni Valle Piana, Lioni, Montecorvino Rovella, Montella, Montemarano, Montoro Superiore, Nusco, Olevano sul Tusciano, Oliveto Citra, San Cipriano Picentino, San Mango Piemonte, Santa Lucia di Serino, Santo Stefano del Sole, Senerchia, Serino, Solofra, Sorbo Serpico, Volturara Irpina.

References

External links
Page at Parks.it 

Regional parks of Italy
Province of Avellino
Province of Salerno
Protected areas of the Apennines